Paul Zacharia, popularly known mononymously as Zacharia,  is an Indian writer of Malayalam literature. Known for his body of literary works composed of short stories, novellas, travelogues, screenplays, essays, columns and children's books, Zacharia is a distinguished fellow of Kerala Sahitya Akademi. He is also a recipient of the Ezhuthachan Puraskaram, Kendra Sahitya Akademi Award and the Kerala Sahitya Akademi Award for Story.

Biography 

Born Mundattuchundayil Paul Scaria (M.P. Scaria) on June 5, 1945, in Urulikunnam, near Kottayam , then in Travancore, Zacharia was the youngest of the three children of M. S. Paul Mundattuchundayil, a farmer, and his wife, Thresiakutty Paul. His early education was at Sree Dayananda Primary School, a local school in Urulikunnam and later he continued his studies at St Joseph's High School, Vilakumadom from where he matriculated in 1960. Subsequently, he completed the pre-University course at St. Thomas College, Palai in 1961 and moved to St. Philomena's College, Mysore to earn his bachelor's degree in English Literature, History, and Economics in 1964. His post-graduate education was at the Central College of Bangalore and after earning a master's degree in English literature in 1966, he started his career as a lecturer of English at MES College, Malleswaram where he worked for a year.

Returning to his home state, Zacharia joined St. Dominic's College, Kanjirappally in 1967 as a lecturer and stayed there until his move to Coimbatore in 1971 to take up the position of the area manager of Ruby Tyre and Rubber Works, Bengaluru. His stay in Coimbatore lasted only a year and shifted his base to New Delhi to spend the next two decades there, working with various media and publishing houses such as Affiliated East-West Press, All India Management Association (AIMA), Press Trust of India (PTI) and the Malayalam edition of the India Today. He returned to Kerala in 1993 and was a part of the group that founded Asianet. There, he also co-hosted a show, Patravisesham, the first television program review, along with a senior journalist, B. R. P. Bhaskar, which ran for 7 years.

Zacharia lives in Thiruvananthapuram.

Literary career
Zacharia has been compared to Jorge Luis Borges as he has limited his creative writing to short stories and novellas. He writes regularly for Kerala's leading newspapers and magazines, has been a public speaker for over two decades airing his non-conformist stance in politics, and his writing is marked by humour and unconventional themes. His columns and articles in English have also appeared in national periodicals such as ‘India Today’, ‘Outlook’, ‘The Week’, ‘The Hindu’ ‘The Deccan Herald,’ ‘The Pioneer’, ‘The Times of India’ ‘The Economic Times’, ‘The Hindustan Times,’ ‘Tehelka’, ‘The New Indian Express’ and ‘The Indian Express’.

A keen traveller, Zacharia has published travelogues on Africa, England, Saudi Arabia, and China, as well as the Kumbh Mela. In his writing career spanning six decades, he has been the recipient of several awards and honours such as the Kendra Sahitya Akademi (Indian Academy of Literature) Award and Kerala Sahitya Akademi (Kerala Academy of Literature) Award. In November 2013 he was elected a Distinguished Fellow of the Kerala Sahitya Akademi.

Paul Zacharia is a member of the Press Club of India, New Delhi and Trivandrum Club, Thiruvananthapuram. He lives in Thiruvananthapuram, and is married to Lalitha. They have a daughter and a son.

Works

Short  story Collections

Novellas 

 
 
 
 </ref>

Travelogues

Collections of  Essays 

 Govindam Bhaja Moodamathe – Current Books, Kottayam, 1992
 
 
 Matha Amrithanandamayi: Bhagyavathiyum Nirbhagyavathiyum – Current Books, Thrissoor, 1999
 
 Matham, samskaram, Mathamoulikavaadam – Current Books, Thrissoor, 2001
 
 Amrithanandamayi: Khattam Randu – Haritham Books, Kozhikode, 2003
 Kayyoppukal, Haritham Books, Kozhikode, 2003
 
 Sthuthiyayirikkatte – Rainbow Books, Chengannoor, 2004
 Italian Connection – Sankeerthanam Publications, Kollam, 2006
 Chavattukuttakal Undakunnathu – Pulari Books, Chennai, 2007
 Njan Ezhuthunnathu Enthukondu? – Sankeerthanam Publications, Kollam, 2008
 Bhakthiyum Pathrapravarthanavum – Olive Books, Kozhikode, 2009
 
 
 Ezhuthukaaranu Parayanullathu, Green Books, 2017
 Maayaasooryan, Green Books, 2017
 Ezhuthukaarkku Indiakku Vendi Enthu Cheyyan Kazhiyum? Olive Books. 2017

Memoirs

Children’s Literature 

 ''Vaayanasaala, – Kearal State Institute of Children’s Literature, Trivandrum, 2008 Padayaali – Kerala State Institute of  Children's  Literature, Trivandrum, 2009
 Shanthanuvinte Pakshikal – Kerala State Institute of Children's Literature, Trivandrum, 2011
 

 Translations into Malayalam 

 Bhavanayude Anthyam – Arundhathi Roy, DC Books, Kottayam, 1999
 Njangal Ningalkku Bhoomi Vittaal – Chief Seattle's speech, DC Books, Kottayam, 2010 
 Oru Enthinenthinu Penkutty – Mahaswetha Devi, Tulika, Chennai, 2003

 Screenplays 
 
 Janani – Sign Books, Trivandrum, 2005

 TV serials 
 Kairalivilasam Lodge, Doordarshan, Thiruvananthapuram, 1988

Translations of Works into Other Languages

English 
 
 
 
 
 This is My Name - The Little Magazine, New Delhi, 2002 (extract from full translation)

German

Kodava 
 Babu Patela- Karnataka Kodava Sahitya Academy, Madikeri, 1996

Awards
 Kendra Sahitya Akademi Award (Indian Academy of Literature)
Ezhuthachan Puraskaram 2020
Vallathol Award 2019
 Kerala Sahitya Akademi Award for Story (Kerala Academy of Literature)
 Distinguished Fellowship of the Kerala Sahitya Akademi

References

Further reading

External links

 
 Paul Zacharia (Library of Congress web-page)

1945 births
Living people
Malayalam-language writers
Writers from Kottayam
Malayalam novelists
Recipients of the Sahitya Akademi Award in Malayalam
Recipients of the Kerala Sahitya Akademi Award
Malayalam short story writers
Indian male short story writers
Indian male novelists
20th-century Indian short story writers
20th-century Indian novelists
Novelists from Kerala
20th-century Indian male writers
People from Pala, Kerala